The discography of Spin Doctors, an American rock band, consists of six studio albums, three live albums, four compilation albums, and twelve singles.

Albums

Studio albums

Live albums

Compilation albums

Singles

Other appearances
 An Epic Tour De Force (promo, 1993) – "What Time is It?" and a special live version of "Jimmy Olsen's Blues" recorded at MTV Drops the Ball '93.
 So I Married an Axe Murderer (soundtrack, July 1993) – "Two Princes" from Pocket Full of Kryptonite
 Stone Free: A Tribute to Jimi Hendrix (tribute, Nov 1993) – "Spanish Castle Magic"
 Philadelphia (soundtrack, Dec 1993) – "Have You Ever Seen the Rain?"
 Space Jam (soundtrack, Nov 1996) – "That's the Way (I Like It)"
 Sandra Boynton's Dog Train (children's compilation, 2005) – "Tantrum"
 Grandma's Boy (soundtrack, 2006) – "Can't Kick the Habit" from Nice Talking to Me

The band's best known track, "Two Princes", also appears on a wide variety of 1990s music and alternative rock compilations.

References

Discography
Rock music group discographies
Discographies of American artists